Gymnoscelis fasciata is a moth in the family Geometridae. It is found in India and on Peninsular Malaysia, Borneo, the Philippines and Sulawesi. The habitat consists of upper montane and dipterocarp forests.

The wings are pale brownish grey with black markings.

References

Moths described in 1891
Gymnoscelis